Frame: Journal of Literary Studies is a biannual journal run by (former) students of literature and literary theory (most from Utrecht University). Since its establishment in 1984 it has been the only Dutch publication forum that allows for a centered discussion on comparative literary studies. The journal publishes articles by international researchers as well as academic lectures, interviews, and critical reviews.  
Issues of Frame usually concentrate on a topic that resonates with cutting-edge research, debates, and discussions within the field of contemporary literary studies, and its editors select articles that provide readers with wide-ranging insight into the current topic. In the special "Masterclass" section, Frame offers Master students of literature the opportunity to acquire much-needed publishing experience. The journal furthermore offers room for conference announcements, symposiums or workshop reports, lectures, and interviews.

In the past, Frame has had the opportunity to work with well-known researchers such as Jonathan Culler, N. Katherine Hayles, J. Hillis Miller and Martha Nussbaum

Recent issues 
 Writing The Self (2015 - 28.1)
 Racism in the Netherlands (2014 - 27.2)
 Human Rights and Literature (2014 - 27.1)
 Ecocriticism (2013 - 26.2)
 Apocalypse (2013 - 26.1)
 Revolution (2012 - 25.2)
 Narrating Posthumanism (2012 - 25.1)
 Literatuur en Erotiek (2011 - 24.2)
 Theory Today (2011 - 24.1)

External links
 

Literary magazines published in the Netherlands
Mass media in Utrecht (city)
Student magazines
Utrecht University
Comparative literature
Research
Magazines established in 1984
Biannual magazines